The 2000–01 Danish 1st Division season was the 56th season of the Danish 1st Division league championship and the 15th consecutive as a second tier competition governed by the Danish Football Association.

The division-champion and runner-up promoted to the 2001–02 Danish Superliga. The teams in the 14th, 15th and 16th relegated to the 2001–02 Danish 2nd Division.

Table

Top goalscorers

See also
 2000–01 in Danish football
 2000–01 Danish Superliga

External links
 Peders Fodboldstatistik

Danish 1st Division seasons
Denmark
2000–01 in Danish football